Shore Cottage, also known as the Lawrence Grant White and Laura Chanler White Estate, is a national historic district located at Head of the Harbor in Suffolk County, New York.  The district encompasses an estate with two contributing buildings.  The estate house was designed in 1913 and is a -story, rectangular block clad in stucco under a gable slate roof.  It was the summer home of the Lawrence Grant White family; he was a son of Stanford White.  Also on the property is a contributing barn.

It was added to the National Register of Historic Places in 1993.

References

Houses on the National Register of Historic Places in New York (state)
Houses completed in 1913
Houses in Suffolk County, New York
1913 establishments in New York (state)
Historic districts on the National Register of Historic Places in New York (state)
National Register of Historic Places in Suffolk County, New York